Chris Ajemian (born November 29, 1986 in Duxbury, Massachusetts) is a professional lacrosse player with the Boston Cannons of Major League Lacrosse.

Professional career

Ajemian was drafted in the 7th round (39th overall selection) of the 2009 Major League Lacrosse Supplemental Draft by Boston Cannons.

Collegiate career

Ajemian attended Fairfield University, where he served as captain of the Fairfield Stags men's lacrosse team during his senior season.  He was an All-NEILA selection and was named to the USILA North/South All-Star game in 2009.

High school career

Ajemian attended Duxbury High School, where he was named a high school All-American in 2005 and helped the Dragons to the 2004 and 2005 state championship.

External links
Boston Cannons profile

References

Major League Lacrosse players
Living people
1986 births
Fairfield Stags men's lacrosse players
Lacrosse players from Massachusetts
People from Duxbury, Massachusetts
Boston Cannons players
Sportspeople from Plymouth County, Massachusetts
Lacrosse midfielders